Rio en Medio (Spanish for river in between) is the pseudonym of singer and baritone ukulelist Danielle Stech-Homsy.

Background
Stech-Homsy was born in New Mexico and later moved to Brooklyn. She began to perform and record original compositions, eventually recording The Bride of Dynamite. The album was a collection of collage-like songs. A friend passed the record to Devendra Banhart who soon requested to release it on his label (Gnomonsong). Since her debut release in early 2007, Stech-Homsye has worked with artists such as Grizzly Bear, CocoRosie, Brightblack Morning Light, Vetiver, Patrick Wolf, Vashti Bunyan, Tim Fite and Banhart.

Rio en Medio's third album, Peace Sequence, was released in 2013 on the feminist exploratory music label Womens Work Recordings.

Musical style
Rio en Medio's music is described as delicate and fragmented songs.

Danielle cites traditional musical styles including tropicalia, Russian, Spanish, American and English folk music, and musicians such as Paul Horn and Mary McCaslin as influences.

Discography

Albums
 The Bride of Dynamite (2007)
 Frontier (2008)
 Peace Sequence (2012)
 Rio en Medio Radio (2015)

Singles
 2008: "Fall Up"/"Heartless"
 2008: "Let's Groove"/"Staying Alive"

References

External links 
 Official Site
 rio-en-medio.html
 Gnomonsong Artists: Rio en Medio

American folk musicians
Living people
Freak folk
Year of birth missing (living people)
People from Brooklyn
People from New Mexico